Boys Club may refer to:

 Boys Club (band), Minnesota, United States R&B duo
The Boys Club, a 1996 crime thriller film directed by John Fawcett (director)
"Boys' Club" (Parks and Recreation), an episode of the American TV series Parks and Recreation
Boy's Club, a comic series by Matt Furie that featured the character Pepe the Frog
 National Association of Boy's Clubs, the forerunner to the English Clubs for Young People
 Brigade Boys Club, a football club based in Kathmandu, Nepal 
 Celtic Boys Club, a youth football club based in Glasgow, Scotland
 Conquest Boys' Club, a Catholic boys' club
 Eton Manor Boys' Club, a boys sports club in London, England
 Lighthouse Boys Club, a youth soccer club in Pennsylvania, United States
 Wallsend Boys Club, a youth football club based in North Tyneside, England

See also
 Boys & Girls Club (disambiguation)
 Gentlemen's club
 List of general fraternities
 University and college fraternity